Andfjorden is a fjord on the border of Nordland and Troms og Finnmark counties in Norway. It primarily flows between the large islands of Andøya and Senja. Grytøya and the smaller islands Bjarkøya and Krøttøya are located in the fjord. The main crossing is via the Andenes–Gryllefjord Ferry between Andøy and Senja municipalities. Other municipalities through which the fjord flows are Harstad, and Kvæfjord.

Whale safaris are run from Andenes and from Krøttøya. Several other fjords branch off the Andfjorden including the Kvæfjorden, Godfjorden, and the Vågsfjorden.

At the tiny Steinavær islands in the Andfjorden, there is a large coral reef.

See also
 List of Norwegian fjords

References

Fjords of Nordland
Fjords of Troms og Finnmark
Vesterålen
Andøy
Senja
Harstad
Kvæfjord